Revolution '76 is a 1989 simulation/strategy game by Britannica Software designed for Apple IIGS and IBM PC. The game was written by former Sid Meier colleague, Ed Bever. The title is a simulation of the economic, social and political conditions at the commencement of the American Revolutionary War.

Reception
Ace magazine felt the game was both complex and manageable. Compute magazine thought the title was a recreation of the war couched inside a video game. Computer Gaming World decided that the game offered depth, challenge, and replay value.

References

External links
 Manual 

1989 video games
Apple IIGS games
Computer wargames
DOS games
Simulation video games
Turn-based strategy video games
Video games about the American Revolution
Video games developed in the United States